Santo Antônio do Palma (Portuguese meaning "Saint Anthony of the palm") is a municipality in the northern part of the state of Rio Grande do Sul, Brazil. The population is 2,123 (2020 est.) in an area of 126.09 km². Its elevation is 669 m.

References

External links
http://www.citybrazil.com.br/rs/stoantoniopalma/ 

Municipalities in Rio Grande do Sul